Michael Oleksa is a Russian Orthodox missionary who spent 35 years travelling and speaking about culture and race in Alaska.

Early life and education
Michael Oleksa was born in Allentown, Pennsylvania. As an adult, after spending a time at St. Vladimir's Seminary in New York, he moved to Alaska in 1970, accepting an invitation from an Alutiiq village on the Island of Kodiak. The invitation and experience in Kodiak motivated Michael Oleksa to continue speaking in Alaska, and did multiple presentations over the next three decades, while also serving as a Russian Orthodox Priest in these relatively small communities.

In 1988, Oleska graduated with his doctoral degree from the Orthodox Theological Seminary in Presov, Slovakia. He made a point to graduate with an emphasis on Native Alaskan history during the Alaskan Russian period, which occurred from 1741 to 1867. He then continued to speak to at least twelve separate villages across Alaska on the issue of race and culture in education. He lives in Anchorage, Alaska, with his wife, his daughter, and one of his three grandsons.

Career 
Oleksa is versed in the field of linguistics, and has written books, articles, and publications focusing on numerous Alaska Native cultures. He created a four-part video series, which aired on PBS, called "Communicating Across Cultures".  His work was so influential, it has made its way into some of JSD's (Juneau School District) senior high curriculum, and all three of the UA (University of Alaska) campuses. He is also a dedicated public speaker, and has travelled through multiple Alaskan villages speaking about various linguistical topics of interest. Michael Oleksa has accumulated a host of titles along his travels, proving his authenticity as a missionary, and a linguist. He is recognized as an "Elder" by the Alaska Federation of Natives, has been honored by the Alaska State Legislature and the National Governors Association, and is acknowledged as a "distinguished public servant" by the Board of Regents of the University of Alaska.

Oleksa is educating teachers across Alaska on the importance of cross-cultural education and the boundaries of race and culture. The most prominent of his texts that focuses on this topic is his collaboration with the Association of Alaska School Boards, which explores the unique cultural fabric of Alaska's educational environment. His most recent work available to the public is from 2006.

Selected publications 
Alaskan Missionary Spirituality.  1987. Paulist Press, Mahway, New Jersey.   3-35.
Another Culture / Another World.  2005.  Association of Alaska School Boards.  Juneau, Alaska.
“Civilizing” Native Alaska: Federal Support of Mission Schools, 1885–1906.  January, 1991.  Prepared for the National Education Association.  Washington, D.C.
Evangelism and Culture.  1995.  International Review of Mission.  Authentic Witness Within Each Culture.  Section 1; Conference on World Mission and Evangelism (Salvador, Bahia, Brazil, 1996). LXXXIV No. 335, October 1995.  The World Council of Churches.  387–393.
Father John Veniaminov and Father Jacob Netsvetov.  July, 1975.  Digital Typography.  www.asna.ca.
I Didn't Even Need a Passport!  February 2006.  Lit Site, Alaska Traditions.
Icons and the Cosmos:  The Missionary Significance.  1983.  International Review of Mission.  Issue 1 – Witnessing.  Vol. LXXII No. 285, January 1983.  The World Council of Churches.  42-123.
Giving and Receiving.  Fall, 2005, AGAIN, The Ancient Christian Faith Today, Vol. 27, No. 3, Page 34.
Orthodox Alaska:  A Theology of Mission.  St. Vladimir's Seminary Press, Crestwood, New York 10707.  1998
Orthodox Missiological Education for the Twenty-First Century.  1996.  The Book, the Circle, and the Sandals.Orbis Books, Maryknoll, New York.  83–90.
Orthodoxy in Alaska:  The Spiritual History of the Kodiak Aleut People.  1981.  St. Vladimir's Theological Quarterly.  Volume 25, Number 1.
Overwhelmed by Joy.  1983.  International Review of Mission.  Conversion.  Vol. LXXII No. 287, July 1983.  The World Council of Churches.  415–420.
Six Alaskan Native Women Leaders: Pre-Statehood. 1991. Alaska Department of Education, Juneau, Alaska
The Creoles and Their Contributions to the Development of Alaska.  1990.  In Smith, Barbara Sweetland and Redmond J. Barnett (eds.) Russian America: The Forgotten Frontier. Tacoma, WA: Washington State Historical Society. 185–195.
The Death of Hieromonk Juvenally.  1990.  Russia in North America: Proceedings of the 2nd International Conference on Russian America, Sitka, Alaska.  August 19–22, 1987.  Limestone Press, Fairbanks, Alaska.  322–357.
The Legacy of St. Vladimir:  Byzantium, Russia, America.  1988.  Papers presented at a Symposium commemorating the Fiftieth Anniversary of St. Vladimir's Orthodox Theological Seminary, Crestwood, New York.  243–258.
The Orthodox Church and Orthodox Christian Mission From an Alaskan Perspective.  2001.  International Review of Mission.  Ecclesiology and Mission (I).  Volume XC No. 358, July 2001.  The World
Chilkat Valley News, Feb. 16, 2006, Haines, Alaska.  "Priest Brings Multicultural Message" by Christa Sadler

References

External links
Catalog of his available publications

Missionary linguists
Year of birth missing (living people)
Living people
Religious leaders from Allentown, Pennsylvania